Fabio Souza dos Santos (born September 7, 1983 in Recife), or simply Fabinho, is a forward player from Brazil who plays for Juventus SC .

Career
On 29 November 2017, Fabinho left ABC to join XV de Piracicaba.

Honours

Joinville
Brazilian Série B: 2014

External links
Central Brasileirão

References

1983 births
Living people
Brazilian footballers
Campeonato Brasileiro Série A players
Campeonato Brasileiro Série B players
Campeonato Brasileiro Série C players
Mirassol Futebol Clube players
Botafogo Futebol Clube (SP) players
Guarani FC players
Associação Portuguesa de Desportos players
Cruzeiro Esporte Clube players
Criciúma Esporte Clube players
Joinville Esporte Clube players
Ceará Sporting Club players
Esporte Clube XV de Novembro (Piracicaba) players
Vila Nova Futebol Clube players
Londrina Esporte Clube players
ABC Futebol Clube players
Grêmio Esportivo Juventus players
Association football forwards
Sportspeople from Recife